Munsbach is a small town in the commune of Schuttrange, in southern Luxembourg. As of 2007, the town has a population of 612. The Baroque style Munsbach Castle from 1775 is home to the Institut Universitaire International Luxembourg which provides educational courses in business, European law and public sector management.

References

Schuttrange
Towns in Luxembourg